Anapistula seychellensis is a species of araneomorph spider that is endemic to the islands of Silhouette, Praslin and Curieuse in the Seychelles. It can be found in woodland habitats in leaf litter. It is threatened by habitat degradation caused by invasive plant species, especially Cinnamomum verum.

References

Symphytognathidae
Endangered animals
Spiders described in 1996
Spiders of Africa
Endemic fauna of Seychelles